A uvulotomy or staphylotomy is any cutting operation performed on the uvula.

The procedure was performed in European medieval medicine. The Norwegian Eiríkr Hákonarson bled to death following such an operation.

Uvulotomy is employed in folk medicine in Tigray.

In the 19th century uvulotomy came to be used as a treatment for snoring. See uvulopalatopharyngoplasty.

Its CPT 2009 code is "42140, Uvulectomy".

References

 Finlay, Alison (editor and translator) (2004). Fagrskinna, a Catalogue of the Kings of Norway. Brill Academic Publishers.  
 Mathew, Oommen P. et al. (1988). Respiratory Function of the Upper Airway'. Marcel Dekker. 
 Uvulotomy Biology Online entry
 Tigrean Cultural Profile EthnoMed article

Mouth and oropharynx surgery